Elections to Bury Council were held on 6 May 1999.  One third of the council was up for election and the Labour Party kept overall control of the council.  Overall turnout was 28.14%.

After the election, the composition of the council was:
Labour 36
Conservative 8
Liberal Democrat 3
Environment and Wildlife 1

Election result

Ward results

References

1999 English local elections
1999
1990s in Greater Manchester